Eremogone congesta is a species of flowering plant in the family Caryophyllaceae known by the common name ballhead sandwort. It is native to western North America from central Canada to the American southwest.

Description
This is a perennial herb forming a tuft of slender upright stems up to about 40 centimeters tall. The leaves are needlelike to thready, up to 8 centimeters long and only a few millimeters wide. They may be fleshy or flat and they often have a very sharp tip. Most of the leaves are located in a patch at the base of the plant, and there are a few scattered along the mostly naked stem.

The inflorescence is an open or rounded cyme of five-petalled white flowers. The fruit is a toothed capsule containing several reddish seeds.

Uses
The plant was used for a variety of medicinal purposes by Native American groups, including the Shoshone.

External links

Jepson Manual Treatment
USDA Plants Profile
Photo Profile
Ethnobotany
Photo gallery

Caryophyllaceae
Flora of Western Canada
Flora of the Western United States
Flora of the Sierra Nevada (United States)
Flora of the California desert regions
Plants described in 1838
Plants used in traditional Native American medicine
Flora without expected TNC conservation status